UTV Stars was a Bollywood lifestyle and glamour-dedicated Indian television channel from UTV Group. It was available in high-definition and standard-definition across India and UAE. Broadly, the content of the channel focused on Bollywood news and music. The channel was primarily targeted at urban Indian youth.

The channel launched on Sky in the UK and Ireland on 11 June 2012. In the region the channel was known as UMP Stars (UTV Motion Pictures Stars) due to legal issues over the UTV brand, which was already in use by the Northern Irish broadcaster UTV Media in Europe. However the channel struggled to attract viewers in the region and was shut down on 23 December 2012.

UTV Stars ceased its operations in May 2014. This channel was rebranded as Bindass Play, launched by The Walt Disney Company (India) on 1 October 2014.

Former shows 
Lux The Choosen One
Up, Close & Personal with Preity Zinta
Live My Life
TV Shivi
Stars @ 12
Breakfast to Dinner
Style Addict
Stars @ 10
Stars In Your City
Yeh Hai Meri Kahani
Star Burst
WTF: What's This Friday

References

External links
Official website

Television channels and stations established in 2011
Television channels and stations disestablished in 2014
Defunct television channels in India
Television stations in Mumbai
UTV Software Communications
Disney India Media Networks